Jonathan Akamba (born October 20, 2000) known by his stage name Akamz is a French dancer, comedian and social media personality.

As of February 2023, with 23 million followers, he is the most followed French user on TikTok.

Early life 
Akamba grew up in Boissy-Saint-Léger.

Career 
In 2018, Akamba became famous in a viral Instagram video by singing and dancing Frère Jacques in a McDonald's.

Racism 
On July 21, 2022, Akamba was a victim of racism in place de l'Opéra, in Paris. A white old lady called him a monkey.

Public image 
Akamba collaborates multiple times with Hugo Boss. In January 2023, he participated at an exclusive event for the BOSS x Perfect Moment's collection with celebrities like Khaby Lame, Naomi Watanabe, Paola Locatelli.

See also 
 List of most-followed TikTok accounts

References

External links 
 
 
 

2000 births
Living people
French TikTokers
French comedians
French dancers